Alice Williamson may refer to:
Alice Motion (born 1984), British scientist,  Alice Williamson
Alice Muriel Williamson (1858-1933), American-English author writing as A. M. Williamson